"Love of a Woman" is a song written by Kevin Brandt, and recorded by American country music artist Travis Tritt.  It was released in June 2001 as the third single from his album Down the Road I Go.  It peaked at number 2 on the U.S. Billboard Hot Country Singles & Tracks, as did Travis Tritt's previous single "It's a Great Day to Be Alive". It also peaked at number 39 on the U.S. Billboard Hot 100.

Critical reception
Chuck Taylor, of Billboard magazine reviewed the song favorably calling it "a gorgeous, understated ballad about the virtues of a good woman's love." He goes on to say that the production is "low-key" and Tritt's vocal is "an engaging blend of country-boy grit and heartfelt passion."

Music video
The music video was directed by Michael Merriman. It was released in August 2001.

Chart positions

Year-end charts

References

2000 songs
Travis Tritt songs
2001 singles
Columbia Records singles
Song recordings produced by Billy Joe Walker Jr.